Agurda (Ağurźa) is a rural locality (a village) in Baishevsky Selsoviet, Zianchurinsky District, Bashkortostan, Russia. The population was 89 as of 2010. There is 1 street.

Geography 
Agurda is located 104 km southeast of Isyangulovo (the district's administrative centre) by road. Bishtiryak is the nearest rural locality.

References 

Rural localities in Zianchurinsky District